The Ministry of Finance of Yugoslavia refers to the finance ministry which was responsible for financial system of the Kingdom of Yugoslavia from 1918 to 1945 and the communist SFR Yugoslavia from 1945 to 1992. It may also refer to the finance ministry of Serbia and Montenegro (officially named the Federal Republic of Yugoslavia) from 1992 to 2003.

List of ministers

Kingdom of Yugoslavia (1918–1941)

Yugoslav government-in-exile (1941–1945)

SFR Yugoslavia (1945–1992)

FR Yugoslavia (1992–2003)

See also
List of governors of national banks of Serbia and Yugoslavia
Ministry of Finance (Serbia)
Ministry of Finance (Croatia)
Ministry of Finance (Montenegro)

External links
List of ministers at Rulers.org
Governments of the Kingdom of the Serbs, Croats & Slovenes (Yugoslavia) 1918–1945

Government of Yugoslavia
Yugoslavia

sr:Списак министара финансија Југославије